Fuxin is a prefecture-level city in northwestern Liaoning province, People's Republic of China, bordering the Inner Mongolia Autonomous Region to the north. As of the 2020 census, its decreasing total population was 1,647,280 inhabitants (1,819,339 in 2010), of whom 716,494 lived in the built-up (or metro) area, encompassing the four urban districts, collectively known as 'Fuxin City'.

Administration
Fuxin has direct administration over 7 county-level divisions: 5 districts, 1 county and 1 autonomous county:

Geography and climate
Fuxin has a monsoon-influenced humid continental climate (Köppen Dwa), with long, cold but dry winters and hot, humid summers. A majority of the annual precipitation falls in July and August alone.

Economy

Fuxin is a mining center in an agricultural region, producing mostly coal and agate. Fuxin is known as China's 'Agate City', with 50% of the nation's known deposits of the mineral being located there. The city also accounts for more than 90% of the country's agate products.

The city suffers from the over-mining of coal, which is low in supply while fundamental to Fuxin's economy.  As the coal mines run dry, Fuxin is trying to find other industries to keep its economy going. Measures taken have included the development of a part of the city as a 'Special Economic Zone', by which the city hopes to attract international investment.

Fuxin was identified as the first city in mainland China with exhausted resources in 2001. Similarly to Hegang, Heilongjiang, where house prices were too low for years, 'cabbage-priced' houses in Fuxin, Liaoning Province, also came under scrutiny in 2020. According to reports by China Business Network and Securities Times, many houses have prices lower than 75 dollars per sqm even for a house with all the necessary furniture.
https://stock.stcn.com/djjd/202008/t20200817_2229969.html

Foreign Investment in 2009

In 2009, Fuxin approved 25 foreign funded enterprises and 2 joint-venture projects. The total value of the contracted funds in these investments exceeded US$143 million.  and the foreign direct investment for that year reached US$64.12 million, up 24% over the previous year. This sum exceeded the Liaoning provincial target for foreign investment by 17%.  In addition, in 7 of the projects, contracted funds were in excess of ten million dollars.

Foreign Direct Investment has enabled the development of new key industries to replace mining. The key industries have made new breakthroughs in foreign direct investment. The Wind Power Industry, which accounted for more than 70% of the total amount of FDI in 2009, has become the main focus of the whole city's FDI.

Education
Liaoning Technical University
 Fuxin College

Transportation

Fuxin is served by the China National Highway 101, which connects Beijing to Shenyang. G25 Changchun–Shenzhen Expressway makes Fuxin into NTHS system. The G2512 Fuxin–Jinzhou Expressway connects Jinzhou and Fuxin.

As regards rail transport, Fuxin is well-connected to the major cities in North and Northeastern China, such as Beijing, Tianjin and Shenyang by a number of trains.

The city is also now connected to Shanghai and the booming Chinese East coast region by a train that runs directly between Shanghai and Fuxin.

Sister city

  Gary, Indiana, United States

See also
 2005 Sunjiawan mine disaster

Notes

External links
 Official Government Site (in Simplified Chinese)
 Information about Fuxin
  Fuxin City Map

 
Cities in Liaoning
Prefecture-level divisions of Liaoning